Nicola Eisenschmid (born 10 September 1996) is a  German ice hockey player and member of the German national team,  playing in the Swedish Women's Hockey League (SDHL) with Djurgårdens IF Hockey Dam. 

She represented Germany at the IIHF Women's World Championships in 2015, 2017, 2019, 2021, and 2022.

Her older brother, Markus Eisenschmid, and older sister, Tanja Eisenschmid, are also German national team ice hockey players.

References

External links

1996 births
Living people
Djurgårdens IF Hockey Dam players
German expatriate ice hockey people
German expatriate sportspeople in Sweden
German ice hockey right wingers
German women's ice hockey forwards
People from Marktoberdorf
Sportspeople from Swabia (Bavaria)